Joanna Rosholm is the former Press Secretary and Deputy Communications Director for the First Lady of the United States, Michelle Obama.

Early life and education 
The day after Rosholm was born, her mother died of Ehlers–Danlos syndromes. She grew up in Tustin, California and attended high school at Foothill High School. After high school, she earned her Bachelor of Arts in Communications from Chapman University and a Master of Arts in Communications from Georgetown University.

Career 
After graduating from Georgetown, Rosholm joined the Democratic National Committee as assistant press secretary. In 2010, she became a regional communications director at the White House.

In January 2014, she replaced Hannah August as Press Secretary to First Lady Michelle Obama, serving until the end of the Obama Administration. She was succeeded by Stephanie Grisham.

References

Obama administration personnel
People from Tustin, California
Chapman University alumni
Georgetown University alumni
Living people
First Lady of the United States press secretaries
Year of birth missing (living people)